Walter Wooten "Bull" Council (April 25, 1882 – November 13, 1943) was a college football player and physician.

Early years
Walter Council was born on April 25, 1882, in Council, North Carolina, which was named for his father, John Pickett Council. His mother was Johnanna Wooten Council. (Her first name, seen in various spellings, is listed as spelled in family records; it derives in part as a tribute to her father, John Wooten, who was thrown from a horse and killed before Johnanna's birth.)

University of North Carolina
Council was a prominent center for the North Carolina Tar Heels football teams of the University of North Carolina from 1900 to 1901.

University of Virginia

1902
John de Saulles brought him to the Virginia Cavaliers football team of 1902, where he played tackle, one of the best in the school's history. Council was selected All-Southern in 1902. He played opposite Branch Johnson on the line.

Physician
He came to Alaska as a youth of 24 in 1905, less than a year after he was graduated with honors from the University of Virginia's medical school, and with a degree of Doctor of Philosophy from the University of North Carolina. At the time of his death he was the Dean of Alaska surgeons, Commissioner of Health for the Territory.

See also
South's Oldest Rivalry

References

External links

1882 births
1943 deaths
Alaska Territory officials
All-Southern college football players
American football tackles
North Carolina Tar Heels football players
People from Bladen County, North Carolina
Physicians from Alaska
Players of American football from North Carolina
Virginia Cavaliers football players
American football centers